Caumont-sur-Orne (literally Caumont on Orne) is a former commune in the Calvados department in the Normandy region in northwestern France. On 1 January 2016, it was merged into the new commune of Thury-Harcourt-le-Hom.

Population

In 2017, the town had 77 residents.

See also
Communes of the Calvados department

References

Former communes of Calvados (department)
Calvados communes articles needing translation from French Wikipedia
Populated places disestablished in 2016